The Proceedings of the Institution of Mechanical Engineers, Part B: Journal of Engineering Manufacture is a peer-reviewed scientific journal that covers research on manufacturing engineering. The journal was established in 1989 and is published by SAGE Publications on behalf of the Institution of Mechanical Engineers.

Abstracting and indexing 
The journal is abstracted and indexed in Scopus and the Science Citation Index. According to the Journal Citation Reports, its 2013 impact factor is 0.661, ranking it 32nd out of 39 journals in the category "Engineering, Manufacturing" and 80th out of 126 journals in the category "Engineering, Mechanical".

References

External links 
 

Engineering journals
English-language journals
Institution of Mechanical Engineers academic journals
Publications established in 1989
Monthly journals
SAGE Publishing academic journals